"Man in the Mirror" is a song by Michael Jackson.

Man in the Mirror may also refer to:

 "Man in the Mirror" (The Avengers), an episode of the TV series The Avengers
 Man in the Mirror: The Michael Jackson Story, a biographical telefilm about Michael Jackson
 The Man in the Mirror (1917 film), a German silent drama film
 The Man in the Mirror (1936 film), a British comedy film
 Man in the Mirror (2008 film), a film made between 1970 and 1972, released in 2008, starring Martin Sheen and Michael Dunn

See also
 The Guy in the Glass, also called The Man in the Glass, 1934 poem by Dale Wimbrow